Keresztes is a Hungarian surname. Notable people with the surname include:
Attila Keresztes, Hungarian fencer
Dóra Keresztes, Hungarian artist
Lajos Keresztes, Hungarian wrestler
László Lóránt Keresztes, Hungarian economist and politician
Noel Keresztes, Hungarian footballer 
Szilárd Keresztes, Hungarian bishop
Zalán Keresztes, Hungarian footballer

See also
Ferenc Keresztes-Fischer, Hungarian politician
Lajos Keresztes-Fischer, Hungarian military officer
Battle of Keresztes, 1596

Hungarian-language surnames